Watch House Battery is a former 19th-century gun battery, built as one of a number of batteries to defend the Eastern approaches to Plymouth Sound, for the defence of the Royal Naval Dockyard at Devonport.

The battery was originally built as a small pentagonal redoubt with emplacements for five guns. By 1893 it was armed with two 64 Pounder Rifled Muzzle Loading Guns. In 1901 the battery was reconstructed for two 6-inch Mark VII breech loading guns with the work being completed in 1903. During the First World War the battery was manned by the Devonshire Royal Garrison Artillery.

After the Second World War the battery remained armed until the dissolution of coast artillery in the United Kingdom in 1956 when it was disarmed. It was released by the military and subsequently used as a children's activity centre for some years. It was Grade II listed in 1969.

References

Bibliography

External sources
 Victorian Forts data sheet on Watch House Battery

Forts in Devon
Military history of Devon
Coastal artillery
Artillery batteries